Naama Maheu Latasi, Lady Latasi, OBE (died 16 March 2012) was a political figure from the Pacific nation of Tuvalu. She stood for election in the constituency of Nanumea in 1989 and was elected to the Parliament of Tuvalu. Lady Latasi served as Minister of Health, Education and Community Services in the first Government of Prime Minister of Tuvalu Bikenibeu Paeniu.  She was the first female member of parliament in Tuvaluan history. An amazing feat, that served to both pave the way for other aspiring female members of parliament today, but propelled the movement of gender equality. She served in Parliament from 1989 to 1997. Although she was not re-elected in the first 1993 general election but regained her seat in parliament in the second 1993 general election.

Involvement in the Girl Guides movement
In 1967, she set up the Olave Kindergarten, named after the founder of the Girl Guides movement, Lady Olave Baden Powell.  

In 1975, Lady Latasi was influential in setting up the headquarters for the Girl Guides Association of Tuvalu in Funafuti following the separation of the Ellice Islands from the Gilbert Islands. She was appointed the first Tuvalu Girl Guides Commissioner.

Biography

Lady Latasi was the first woman to be elected to the Parliament of Tuvalu. She remained the only woman ever to have served in the Tuvaluan Parliament until Pelenike Isaia won the August 2011 by-election for the constituency of Nui.

In the 1993 New Year Honours she was appointed an OBE.

She was married to Sir Kamuta Latasi, a former Prime Minister of Tuvalu and subsequently Speaker of the Parliament of Tuvalu. Lady Latasi died on 16 March 2012.

See also
 Politics of Tuvalu

Notes and references 

Year of birth missing
2012 deaths
Members of the Parliament of Tuvalu
Spouses of prime ministers of Tuvalu
People from Nanumea
20th-century women politicians
Women government ministers of Tuvalu
Education ministers of Tuvalu
Health ministers of Tuvalu
Wives of knights
Officers of the Order of the British Empire